Yu Prefecture, also known by its Chinese name Yuzhou and as Weizhou or Wei Prefecture, was a prefecture (zhou) of imperial China, centered on present-day Yu County, Hebei. It was one of the Sixteen Prefectures ceded by Later Jin to the Khitan-ruled Liao dynasty.

Yuzhou, the seat of Yu County, retains its name.

Geography
The administrative region of Yuzhou in the Tang dynasty is the border area of western Hebei and northern Shanxi:
Under the administration of Zhangjiakou, Hebei:
Yu County
Yangyuan County
Under the administration of Baoding, Hebei:
Laiyuan County
Under the administration of Datong, Shanxi:
Tianzhen County
Yanggao County
Guangling County
Lingqiu County

References
 

Former prefectures in Hebei
Former prefectures in Shanxi
Sixteen Prefectures
Prefectures of the Sui dynasty
Prefectures of the Tang dynasty
Prefectures of Later Tang
Prefectures of the Liao dynasty
Prefectures of the Jin dynasty (1115–1234)
Prefectures of the Yuan dynasty
Prefectures of the Ming dynasty
Prefectures of the Qing dynasty
History of Zhangjiakou